Mr. Justice Raffles is a 1921 British crime film directed by Gaston Quiribet and starring Gerald Ames, Eileen Dennes and James Carew.

It was based on the 1909 novel Mr. Justice Raffles by E.W. Hornung featuring his gentleman thief AJ Raffles. The plot changed a number of details from the novel and inserted a romantic interest into the plot which sees Raffles fall in love with Camilla Belsize, while trying to conceal his secret life as a leading cracksman from her.

Cast
 Gerald Ames as A.J. Raffles 
 Eileen Dennes as Camilla Belsize 
 James Carew as Dan Levy 
 Hugh Clifton as Teddy Garland 
 Lyonel Watts as Bunny 
 Gwynne Herbert as Lady Laura Belsize 
 Henry Vibart as Mr. Garland 
 Peggy Patterson as Dolly Fairfield 
 Pino Conti as Foreigner 
 Townsend Whitling as Tough

References

External links

1921 films
British silent feature films
1921 crime films
Films set in London
Works based on A. J. Raffles
Films based on British novels
Hepworth Pictures films
British black-and-white films
British crime films
1920s British films